Dominic Foos (born 3 September 1997) is a German professional golfer.

After winning several junior amateur tournaments in Germany and internationally, Foos turned professional in 2014.

Foos played on the Challenge Tour in 2015 and won the Gant Open in August at the age of 17 years, 347 days – making him the youngest winner in Challenge Tour history.

Amateur wins
2011 Florida International Junior
2012 German Match Play, German Boys Open, German National Boys Championship
2013 French International Juniors, German Boys Open

Source:

Professional wins (1)

Challenge Tour wins (1)

Team appearances
Amateur
Jacques Léglise Trophy (representing Continental Europe): 2012 (winners), 2013
Junior Ryder Cup (representing Europe): 2012
European Amateur Team Championship (representing Germany): 2013
Bonallack Trophy (representing Europe): 2014 (winners)

References

External links

German male golfers
European Tour golfers
Sportspeople from Karlsruhe
Sportspeople from Dubai
1997 births
Living people